Roketsan Research Center, officially Roketsan Satellite Launch, Space Systems and Advanced Technologies Research Center is a research center of the Turkish defense systems company Roketsan for space-related technologies. Based in Ankara, it was established on 30 August 2020.

One of the projects of the research center is the development of a Micro Satellite Launch System (MSLS) capable of delivering microsatellites with a mass up to   into Low Earth orbits  with an altitude of minimum  . It is planned that the system will be available in 2025.

References

Roketsan
Government-owned companies of Turkey
Research in Turkey
Space program of Turkey
Turkish companies established in 2020
Companies based in Ankara,